The South West Book - A Tasmanian Wilderness is a book published by the Australian Conservation Foundation in 1978 during concern following the damming of Lake Pedder in Tasmania.

It was edited by Helen Gee and Janet Fenton with assistance from Greg Hodge and artwork directed by Chris Cowles. At 308 pages, it was the most comprehensive book concerned with a region from all aspects of its kind in Australian publishing at that time.

With over 40 authors of 50 sections as well as chronology of events and bibliography the book covered industrial issues, conservation issues, as well as the development of the bureaucratic and political status of what eventually became the South West Tasmania World Heritage area.

Publication details

See also
 South West Tasmania Resources Survey

Notes

External links
 http://www.unep-wcmc.org/sites/wh/taswild.html- cited as reference

South West Tasmania
Australian non-fiction books
History of Tasmania
Books about Tasmania